Marco Antonio Enríquez-Ominami Gumucio (born 12 June 1973) is a Chilean-French, filmmaker, politician, and perennial candidate. From 2006 to 2010 he was a Socialist Party deputy in Chile's lower chamber. In 2009 he quit the party and ran for President of the Republic as independent, where he finished third with 20% of the vote. He is currently the leader of the Progressive Party, which he founded in 2010.

Enríquez-Ominami is the son of Revolutionary Left Movement's historical leader Miguel Enríquez and sociologist Manuela Gumucio. His adoptive father is former senator Carlos Ominami. Enríquez-Ominami is married to the Chilean TV hostess Karen Doggenweiler, and has two children. Because of his long name he is frequently called MEO or ME-O both in writing and in speech.

Early life

Enríquez-Ominami was born in Santiago, Chile to Miguel Enríquez Espinosa, the founder and secretary general of the Revolutionary Left Movement (MIR), and Manuela Gumucio Rivas, daughter of Rafael Agustín Gumucio Vives, a former senator and founder of the Falange Nacional political party. He is of Spanish, German and Scottish descent by his father's side, also Bolivian and Basque from his mother's side.

In November 1973, two months after the military coup d'état which ousted the government of President Salvador Allende Enríquez-Ominami and his family were expelled from the country via a military decree, and barred from entering the country for the next ten years. His father, who stayed in the country to organize and lead an underground résistance against the Augusto Pinochet dictatorship, was assassinated in October 1974 by DINA agents who uncovered his secret location in Santiago.

Enríquez-Ominami and his family found refuge in France, where he grew up speaking French as his first language. He completed his primary education at Lycée Victor Hugo in Paris between 1981 and 1986. He then finished his secondary education at Colegio Alianza Francesa and Saint George's College in Santiago.

Film and television career

From 1990 to 1995 Enríquez-Ominami completed a bachelor's degree in Philosophy from the University of Chile, where he was vice president of his major's student board. In 1996 he attended an intensive workshop for film directors at La Fémis in Paris.

From 1998 Enríquez-Ominami began working as executive director of Rivas y Rivas producing company. In 2002 after producing and directing several shorts, feature films, reports, television ads and television films, he directed the political documentary Chile, los héroes están fatigados ("Chile, the heroes are exhausted"), which was selected to open the 16th FIPA film festival in Biarritz. The documentary was awarded at film festivals in Serbia and Montenegro and San Diego, California. In 2005 Enríquez-Ominami created and presided the ChileMedios Foundation, through which he developed several studies on local television audience behavior. He worked as professor of film production in Chilean and Peruvian universities and collaborated in political campaigns for Ricardo Lagos and Carlos Ominami in Chile and also in Peru and Mexico.

Political career

In December 2005 Enríquez-Ominami was elected deputy for District 10 in central Chile for a period of four years. He obtained the highest vote in that district's history. As deputy he worked on the Science and Technology and Agricultural commissions, and presided the Investigating Commission on State-funded advertisement and the Special Commission on the study of the Chilean political regime. He has introduced around 150 bills, many of which have been approved.

In December 2008, Enríquez-Ominami said he was available to compete with José Miguel Insulza and Eduardo Frei in the Concertación presidential primaries. However, after claiming the Concertación leadership changed the primary rules in order to bar him from the process, Enríquez-Ominami decided to run as an independent. With the financial support of businessman Max Marambio, he began the process of collecting nearly 36,000 signatures needed to register his independent candidacy. He made extensive use of social networking Internet sites for this effect. In June 2009 he resigned from the Socialist Party to meet the legal deadline.

Despite being relatively unknown, Enríquez-Ominami quickly rose in opinion polls, garnering 10% of support by April 2009, capturing the leftist electorate dissatisfied with the choice of Christian Democrat Eduardo Frei as the Concertación candidate. For the parallel legislative elections, he launched his own list of candidates, which was split between independent candidates (including three lawmakers seeking reelection) and members of two minor parties that supported his candidacy: the Humanist Party and the Ecologist Party. He placed the strongest candidates in districts where Concertación party-leaders were vying for seats. However, though he made a strong showing, Enríquez-Ominami ultimately fell short and was eliminated in the first round of voting with 20.13% of the vote. His parliamentary list also failed to win any seats, obtaining a low 4% of the vote. After the election, he refused to endorse either candidate, saying "Eduardo Frei and Sebastián Piñera are too much alike [...] They don't represent hope, nor change, nor the future." On December 16, his economic advisor, Paul Fontaine, joined Piñera's runoff campaign. Nearly a week later another one of his economic advisors, Luis Eduardo Escobar, joined Frei's team. Finally, four days before the election Enríquez-Ominami held a press conference where he said he was going to vote for the "candidate of the 29%," meaning to vote for Frei, but maintaining his supporters were free to choose their own candidate.

In the 2013 General Election, Enríquez-Ominami competed for the Presidency of Chile for the second time, while representing the Progressive Party. This time he secured third place obtaining only 10,98% of the votes. Enríquez-Ominami also run for the Presidency of Chile in the General Election of 2017. He gathered 5,71% of the vote and placed sixth among 9 candidates.

Works
Animales políticos. Dialogos filiales. Enríquez-Ominami, Marco; Ominami Pascual, Carlos. 2004.

Further reading

References

External links

Official campaign web site

1973 births
Chilean adoptees
Chilean film directors
Candidates for President of Chile
Chilean people of Basque descent
Chilean people of German descent
Chilean people of Scottish descent
Chilean people of Bolivian descent
Chilean people of French descent
University of Chile alumni
Living people
Politicians from Santiago
Socialist Party of Chile politicians
Progressive Party (Chile) politicians
Members of the Chamber of Deputies of Chile